Limburg-Styrum-Gemen was a county of medieval Germany, based in the Lordship of Gemen in modern North Rhine-Westphalia. It was partitioned from Limburg-Styrum in 1644, and in 1657 partitioned into itself and Limburg-Styrum-Iller-Aichheim. As Limburg-Styrum-Gemen ruled an Imperial Estate (Gemen), the Counts had a seat on the Bench of Counts of Westphalia. The line of Counts became extinct in 1782 and was inherited by the Counts of Limburg-Styrum-Iller-Aichheim.

Counts of Limburg-Styrum-Gemen (1644–1782)

House of Limburg
Counties of the Holy Roman Empire
House of Limburg-Stirum